This is a list of airlines which have an Air Operator Certificate issued by the Civil Aviation Authority  of Indonesia.

There are two types of AOC in Indonesia, AOC 121 and AOC 135. AOC 121 is for commercial scheduled airlines with more than 30 passengers. AOC 135 is for commercial scheduled airlines with 30 or less passengers and chartered airlines. There are 22 AOC 121 holders and 32 AOC 135 holders.

By 12 January 2012 all Indonesian scheduled airlines have to operate with at least ten aircraft, and a minimum of five aircraft should be owned. The Ministry of Transport has the right to withdraw their operating certificate in case they do not comply with this regulation (Law Number 1, 2009 about air transport). The application of the regulation was postponed for one year, while in the postponed time the airlines should give a business plan and a contract letter for the leasing aircraft for at least one year ahead.

The largest low-cost carrier airlines include Lion Air, Indonesia AirAsia and Citilink, a subsidiary of Garuda Indonesia.

The safety-related ban on Indonesian airlines flying to European Union has been partially lifted since 2009 with Garuda Indonesia, Airfast Indonesia, Mandala Airlines, Express Transportasi Antarbenua, Indonesia AirAsia and Batavia Air being taken off the list. On 21 April 2011 the EU lifted the ban of Cardig Air, Republic Express, Asia Link and Air Maleo - all being cargo carriers. The ban had been imposed after a string of accidents.

On 14 June 2018, all Indonesian Airlines were removed from the list of air carriers banned in the EU.

There are three categories of On Time Performance (OTP) for commercial scheduled airlines in Indonesia (2017 average published by Indonesian Directorate General Of Civil Aviation):
 Green, more than 80 percent (the airlines in this category are NAM Air: 92.62 percent, Sriwijaya Air: 88.69 percent, Batik Air: 88.66 percent, Garuda Indonesia: 88.53 percent and Citilink: 88.33 percent)
 Yellow, 70 to 80 percent (Indonesia AirAsia: 75.94 percent, Xpress Air: 74.40 percent, Susi Air: 72.65 percent, TransNusa: 71.36 percent and Lion Air: 71.32 percent)
 Red, below 70 percent (Wings Air: 65.47 percent and Trigana Air: 42.49 percent)

Since 1 January 2012 the airlines have to give a Rp300,000 ($22) voucher to each passenger as compensation for a delayed flight of more than four hours and the voucher should be able to be disbursed on that day or on the following day. Bad weather or operational and technical problems, such as refueling delays or a damaged runway are exempted from this requirement. For flights diverted to other destinations the airlines have to make all necessary arrangements to get the passengers to their original destinations plus Rp.150,000 compensation. Any flight cancellations must be made seven days prior to a flight and passengers will receive a full refund and cancellation within seven days of departure. The airlines have to pay compensation equal to the value of the ticket on top of the full refund. Batavia Air was the first airline with a delay more than four hours of Palangkaraya-Surabaya route due to operational problem on 2 January 2011. The airlines should pay a total of Rp42 million ($4,242) compensation to all passengers.

Scheduled airlines

Charter airlines

Cargo airlines

Other airlines
 Air Born Indonesia
 Asco Nusa Air
 Deraya Air Taxi
 Mimika Air
 Transwisata Prima Aviation

See also 
List of airlines
List of air carriers banned in the European Union
List of defunct airlines of Asia
List of defunct airlines of Indonesia

References

External links
  Directorate General of Civil Aviation (DGCA)  - the CAA of Indonesia
 ICAO 8585 from Eurocontrol

 
Indonesia
Airlines
Indonesia
Airlines